The Santa Fe-class submarines, also known as the Tarantinos after the city in which they were built, were a class of three pre-World War II submarines, designed and built in Italy in 1928-1933, as part of an Argentine expansion plan for its navy. They were in service with the Argentine Navy from the early 1930s to the late 1950s.  The class was named after Argentine provinces starting with “S”, as traditional in the Argentine Navy.

Design 
All three ships in the Santa Fe class were built by the Franco Tosti Shipyard in Taranto, Italy.

Service history

Santa Fe 
The Santa Fe was launched July 29, 1931 and was affirmed the national flag on October 26, 1932. It, along with its twins, "Santiago del Estero" and "Salta", sailed to Buenos Aires where it arrived April 7, 1933. It received its combat flag in its namesake port of Santa Fe on October 15, 1933. It arrived in Mar del Plata on September 1, 1933, where it was used until its decommissioning in 1956 for the training of Navy personnel.

In a strong storm in the July 1938, the Santa Fe rescued a fishing boat in the waters of Cape Corrientes.

Santiago del Estero

Specifications

Ships in class

See also 
 List of ships of the Argentine Navy
 Italian submarines of World War II
 Submarine Force Command

Footnotes

References

Notes

Bibliography

Further reading

External links 

 “Tarantinos” class submarines - Histarmar website (Historia y Arqueología Marítima – Submarinos Clase “Tarantinos”) (accessed 2016-12-30)
 “Santa Fe” submarine S1 - Histarmar website (Historia y Arqueología Marítima – Submarino “Santa Fe” S1) (accessed 2016-12-31)
 “Santiago del Estero” submarine S2 later S3 - Histarmar website (Historia y Arqueología Marítima – Submarino “Santiago del Estero” S2 luego S3) (accessed 2016-12-31)
 “Salta” submarine S3 later S2 - Histarmar website (Historia y Arqueología Marítima – Submarino “Salta” S3 luego S2) (accessed 2016-12-31)

Submarine classes
Santa Fe class submarines (1931)
Submarines of Argentina
Ships built in Italy
Ships built by Cantieri navali Tosi di Taranto
Argentina–Italy relations